The Helena  World is a weekly newspaper based in Helena-West Helena, Arkansas that serves Phillips County.  It is published on Wednesdays in print but has a website, www.helenaworld.org, which is updated daily.  The publication was founded in 1871 and has operated continuously since.  

It was formerly owned by Gatehouse Media. In 2019 the company stated that it planned to close the newspaper, but that year businesspeople Andrew Bagley and Chuck Davis announced that they will acquire the publication.

In 2020, Bagley and Davis announced that they had acquired the buildings old headquarters at 417 York Street and would be rehabilitating the facility and returning the paper to its former home where it had been housed from 1961 to 2019.

References

External links
 The Helena-West Helena World
 

Newspapers published in Arkansas